This article contains past rosters  of the Fenerbahçe Men's Basketball team.

1990 Era

1990/91

Titles

  Turkish League
  Turkish President's Cup

Roster

1991/92

Roster

1992/93

Titles

  Turkish League Runner-up

Roster

1993/94

Titles

  Turkish Cup Runner-up
  Turkish President's Cup

Roster

1994/95

Titles

Roster

1995/96

Honors

 Korać Cup Quarter Finalist

Roster

1996/97

Roster

1997/98

Roster

1998/99

Roster

1999/00

Roster

2000 Era

2000/01

Honors

 Korać Cup Quarter Finalist

Roster

2001/02

Honors

 Korać Cup Quarter Finalist

Roster

2002/03

Roster

2003/04

Honors

  EuroCup Third

Roster

2004/05

Honors

  EuroCup Forth

Roster

2005/06

Roster

2006/07

Titles
  Turkish League
  Turkish President's Cup

Roster

2007/08

Titles
  Turkish League
  Turkish President's Cup Runner-up

Honors
 Euroleague Quarter Finalist

Roster

2008/09

Titles
  Turkish League Runner-up
  Turkish Cup

Roster

2009/10

Titles
  Turkish League
  Turkish Cup

Roster 

(*) Played Turkish Basketball League play-off matches after loan-back.

2010 Era

2010/11

Titles
  Turkish League
  Turkish Cup
  Turkish President's Cup

Roster

2011/12

Roster

2012/13

  Turkish Cup

Roster

2013/14

Titles
  Turkish League
  Turkish President's Cup

Roster 
 

(*) Loaned out to Royal Halı Gaziantep for second half of the season.

(**) Played only one Turkish Basketball League and two EuroLeague games.

2014/15

Titles

 Euroleague Final Four 
  Turkish Cup Runner-up
  Turkish President's Cup Runner-up

Roster 
 

(*) Players loaned out in season.

2015/16

Titles
  Euroleague Runner-up
  Turkish League
  Turkish Cup

Roster 
 

(*) Out of squad by coach decision about discipline problem.

2016/17

Titles

  Euroleague
  Turkish League
  Turkish President's Cup

Roster

2017/18

Titles
  Euroleague Runner-up
  Turkish League
  Turkish President's Cup

Roster

2018/19

Titles
 Euroleague Final Four 
  Turkish President's Cup

Roster

2019/20

Titles
  Turkish Cup

Roster

2020 Era

2020/21

Roster

See also
See also Fenerbahçe (women's basketball) past rosters

References

     
EuroLeague team past rosters